Bridge End is a hamlet in County Durham, England. It is situated on the south bank of the River Wear, on the other side of Weardale from Frosterley, and near Hill End and White Kirkley.

References

Hamlets in County Durham
Stanhope, County Durham